Musée alsacien may refer to:
Musée alsacien (Haguenau)
Musée alsacien (Strasbourg)